Rūh al-Ma'ānī fī Tafsīri-l-Qur'āni-l-'Aẓīm wa Sab'u-l-Mathānī is a 30-volume tafsir of the Qur'an, authored by the 19th-century Iraqi Islamic scholar Mahmud al-Alusi.

Comments of the Scholars of the Later Centuries
Mawlānā Sayyid Muhammad Yoosuf Binnori (R'A), the favourite student of 'Allamah Anwar Shah Kashmiri (R'A), has written in his Yatīmatu-l-Bayān. Muqaddimah (Preface to) Mushkilātu-l-Qur'ān:

The third is Tafseer Roohu-l-Ma'ani which in my opinion is an exegesis for the Qur'an on the pattern of Fath al-Bari, the exegesis of Sahih al-Bukhari, except that Fath al-Bari is the interpretation of human words. It has paid the debt of the exegesis of Sahih al-Bukhari on the Ummah. But the Words of Allah are much higher and more exalted for any human being to give its due right.

Mufti Muhammad Taqi Usmani (DB) has written in his 'Ulūmu-l-Qur'ān (An Approach to the Qur'anic Sciences):

Since this is the publication of latest era, he has tried to gather important discussions of previous exegeses. Hence elaborate discussions have been carried out on language, grammar, literature, rhetoric, jurisprudence, beliefs, etymology, geophysics, astronomy, philosophy, spiritualism, and relevant narrations. An attempt has been made that no scientific and literary problem should remain unanswered. In the matter of reporting of Traditions also 'Allamah Alusi (R'A) had been more careful than other commentators. In this respect it may be called synopsis of the earlier exegeses, and no work on exegesis of Qur'an can do without help from this work.

Editions
1-30 in 15 volumes set, Editors: Mohammad al-Amad and Omar al-Salami, Introduction: al-Taher bn Ashur, Publisher: Dar Ihia al-Turath al-Arabi-Libanon

See also
List of Sunni books

References

External links
http://www.haqislam.org/ramadan/fasting-in-quraan.htm
 Haq Islam

Alusi